The Merlimau state by-election is a state by-election that was scheduled to be held on 6 March 2011 in the state of Malacca, Malaysia. The nomination of candidates was scheduled on 26 February 2011.  The Merlimau seat fell vacant following the death of its state assemblyman Datuk Mohamad Hidhir Abu Hasaan of United Malays National Organisation from a heart attack at the Putra Specialist Hospital in Malacca. Previously Mohamad Hidhir won the Merlimau seat with a 2,154 vote majority, beating PAS' Jasme Tompang at the 2008 Malaysian general elections. The state assembly seat has around 10,400 voters, comprising mainly 64% Malays, 21% Chinese and 14% Indians. For the by-election PAS picked as its candidate, Yuhaizad Abdullah while Barisan Nasional picked Roslan Ahmad.

Results

References

2011 elections in Malaysia
2011 Merlimau by-election
Elections in Malacca